The following is a complete list of books published by Tom Clancy, an American author of contemporary spy fiction and military fiction.

Works by year of publication 

1. The Hunt for Red October (1984) Clancy's first published novel. CIA analyst Jack Ryan assists in the defection of a respected Soviet naval captain, who commands Red October, the Soviet Navy's most advanced ballistic missile submarine. The 1990 movie stars Alec Baldwin as Ryan and Sean Connery as Captain Ramius.
2. Red Storm Rising (1986, with Larry Bond) War between NATO and USSR. This book is not a member of the Ryanverse, although a protagonist of the story, Robert Toland, has many similarities with Jack Ryan.
3. Patriot Games (1987) Prequel to The Hunt for Red October. Jack Ryan, as well as his family, becomes a target of the Ulster Liberation Army (ULA), a fictional offshoot of the Irish Republican Army, for foiling their attack on the Prince and Princess of Wales in London. The 1992 movie stars Harrison Ford as Ryan and Samuel L. Jackson as Robby Jackson.
4. The Cardinal of the Kremlin (1988) The sequel to The Hunt for Red October. First appearance of John Clark and Sergey Golovko. Ryan leads a CIA operation aimed at extracting the agency's highest agent-in-place in the Kremlin, codenamed CARDINAL, who is being hunted by the KGB, and simultaneously forces the head of the KGB to defect.
5. Clear and Present Danger (1989) The President authorizes the CIA to use American military forces in a covert war against a drug cartel in Colombia. The operation is betrayed. Ryan meets Clark as they lead a mission to rescue the abandoned soldiers. Domingo "Ding" Chavez (Clark's protege in later novels) is one of the rescued soldiers. The 1994 film stars Harrison Ford as Ryan, Willem Dafoe as Clark, and Raymond Cruz as Chavez.
6. The Sum of All Fears (1991) Palestinian and former East German terrorists find a nuclear weapon that had been lost by Israel, and use it to attack the United States. This nearly triggers a war between the U.S. and the Soviet Union, due to the incompetence of the new President and his mistress with an anti-Ryan agenda. Ryan intervenes to avert the war. The 2002 film stars Ben Affleck as Ryan and Liev Schreiber as Clark, and changes the identity and motivation of the terrorists to neo-Nazis.
7. Without Remorse (1993) Without Remorse takes place during the Vietnam War, when Ryan was a teenager. Ex-SEAL John Kelly (then John Clark) fights a one-man war against drug dealers in Baltimore, attracting the attention of Jack's father Emmet, a Baltimore police detective. He also helps plan and execute a raid on a prisoner-of-war camp in North Vietnam. Clark later joins the CIA.
8. Debt of Honor (1994) A secret cabal of extreme nationalists gains control of Japan and start a war with the U.S. Ryan, now National Security Advisor, as well as Clark and Chavez, agents in Japan, help win the war. The Vice President resigns in a scandal, and the President appoints Ryan to replace him.  A vengeful Japanese airline pilot then crashes a jetliner into the U.S. Capitol during a joint session of Congress attended by most senior U.S. government officials, including the President.  Ryan thus becomes the new President through succession.
9. Executive Orders (1996) Now-President Ryan survives press hazing, an assassination attempt, and a biological warfare attack on the United States. Clark and Chavez trace the virus to a Middle Eastern madman, and the U.S. military goes to work.
10. SSN: Strategies for Submarine Warfare (1996, with  Martin Greenberg) Follows the missions of USS Cheyenne in a future war with China precipitated by China's invasion of the disputed Spratly Islands.  Also not part of the Ryanverse, SSN is actually a loosely connected collection of "scenario" chapters in support of the eponymous video game.
11. Rainbow Six (1998) Released to coincide with the video game of the same name. Clark and Chavez, who is now Clark's son-in-law, lead an elite multinational anti-terrorist unit that combats a worldwide genocide attempt by eco-terrorists.
12. The Bear and the Dragon (2000) War between Russia and China. Ryan recognizes the independence of Taiwan, Chinese police officers kill a Roman Catholic Cardinal, and American armed forces help Russia defeat a Chinese invasion of Siberia.
13. Red Rabbit (2002) In the early 1980s, CIA analyst Ryan aids in the defection of a Soviet officer who knows of a plan to assassinate Pope John Paul II.
14. The Teeth of the Tiger (2003) Jack Ryan's son Jack Ryan, Jr. becomes an analyst for The Campus, an off-the-books intelligence agency with the freedom to discreetly assassinate individuals "who threaten national security", following the end of the Ryan administration. Also features his two cousins Dominic and Brian Caruso.
15. Dead or Alive (2010, with Grant Blackwood) The story picks up where The Teeth of the Tiger left off with Jack Ryan, Jr. and The Campus trying to catch an Osama bin Laden-type of terrorist known as the Emir.
16. Against All Enemies (2011, with Peter Telep) After surviving a Taliban bombing attack in Pakistan that claims the lives of his colleagues and his asset, CIA paramilitary officer and former Navy SEAL Max Moore is assigned by a government joint task force to take down a Mexican drug cartel. Along the way, he must deal with Taliban terrorists trying to enter the United States through the Mexico-US border.
17. Locked On (2011, with Mark Greaney) While Jack Ryan Jr. trains to become a field operative within The Campus, his father campaigns for re-election as President of the United States. A devout enemy of Jack Senior launches a privately funded vendetta to discredit him, while a corrupt Pakistani general has entered into a deadly pact with Dagestani terrorists to procure nuclear warheads.
18. Threat Vector (2012, with Mark Greaney) President Jack Ryan and The Campus must deal with a Chinese expansionist government intent on annexing territories in the South China Sea by military force as well as Hong Kong, Macau, and Taiwan. They must also deal with a Chinese version of The Campus, which are instrumental for a series of devastating cyber attacks on American infrastructure.
19. Command Authority (2013, with Mark Greaney) President Jack Ryan, with help from The Campus, deals with new Russian strongman Valeri Volodin, who is intent on annexing Ukraine. Along the way, he must also contend with his rise to power, which is anchored on a dark secret that Ryan himself had encountered back when he was a CIA analyst.

Post-Clancy novels
Note: The following titles were not written by Clancy. They continue to develop the storylines of Clancy's novels but were written after his death.
1. Support and Defend (2014, by Mark Greaney) FBI agent and The Campus operative Dominic Caruso must stop a seemingly rogue National Security Council (NSC) staffer who had run off with top secret documents and is being pursued by Iranians and the Russians.
2. Full Force and Effect (2014, by Mark Greaney) President Jack Ryan and The Campus must stop North Korean leader Choi Ji-hoon from developing his country's nuclear weapons program.
3. Under Fire (2015, by Grant Blackwood) Jack Ryan, Jr. helps his mysterious friend Seth Gregory, who is involved in Dagestan's struggle for independence from Russia.
4. Commander in Chief (2015, by Mark Greaney) President Jack Ryan and The Campus must stop Russian president Volodin from launching a covert violent offensive in an effort to bring back Russia as a superpower.
5. Duty and Honor (2016, by Grant Blackwood) Jack Ryan Jr. must stop a German private contractor from unleashing false flag attacks to profit from the war on terror.
6. True Faith and Allegiance (2016, by Mark Greaney) President Jack Ryan and The Campus must contain a massive intelligence breach that has been responsible for a series of terrorist attacks on American military and intelligence personnel.
7. Point of Contact (2017, by Mike Maden) While in Singapore, Jack Ryan Jr. must help his mysterious colleague in Hendley Associates Paul Brown avert a North Korean plot to crash the Asian stock market.
8. Power and Empire (2017, by Marc Cameron) President Jack Ryan and The Campus must prevent a secret cabal heightening the tensions between the United States and China from causing a violent coup in the Chinese government.
9. Line of Sight (2018, by Mike Maden) Jack Ryan, Jr. is in Bosnia and Herzegovina partly on his mother’s errand to track down her former patient. While evading a Bulgarian crime boss who has a vendetta against him, he has to avert a sinister plot by Turkey to provoke war between NATO and the Russians in the Balkans.
10. Oath of Office (2018, by Marc Cameron) President Jack Ryan deals with a domestic flu outbreak, a political rival with an anti-Ryan agenda, and a hostage situation in the United States embassy in Cameroon. The Campus uncovers a sinister plot behind a series of protests in Iran, favorably dubbed as the Persian Spring.
11. Enemy Contact (2019, by Mike Maden) While investigating on a seemingly unrelated matter in Poland, Jack Ryan, Jr. finds out about a breach in the U.S. intelligence community.
12. Code of Honor (2019, by Marc Cameron) President Jack Ryan deals with the imprisonment of his friend and former CIA colleague Father Pat West in Indonesia. The Campus race against time to retrieve next-generation AI software before the Chinese military use it for sinister purposes.
13. Firing Point (2020, by Mike Maden) Jack Ryan, Jr. investigates the death of his former classmate in a bombing in Barcelona, Spain, while President Jack Ryan scrambles to track down those responsible for the disappearances of container ships across the oceans.
14. Shadow of the Dragon (2020, by Marc Cameron) John Clark, his Campus team, and CIA go to Xinjiang, China, to help a Uyghur submarine scientist, also a freedom fighter against Chinese government, who holds the key information for the US to investigate Chinese submarine activities in the Arctic Ocean.
15. Target Acquired (2021, by Don Bentley)
16. Chain of Command (2021, by Marc Cameron) The vice president of the US dies in Tokyo, Japan, the first lady Cathy Ryan is kidnapped at San Antonio River Walk, and an American doctor couple is kidnapped in Wakhan Corridor of Afghanistan. The Campus race against time to find the Indian pharmaceutical company behind all these events.
17. Zero Hour (2022, by Don Bentley) Traveling in Seoul, South Korea, Jack Ryan, Jr, along with two green berets, sneaks into North Korea to prevent a coup and a war.
18. Red Winter (2022, by Marc Cameron)
19. Flash Point (forthcoming 2023, by Don Bentley)

Non-fiction

Guided Tour
Submarine: A Guided Tour Inside a Nuclear Warship (1993)
Armored Cav:  A Guided Tour of an Armored Cavalry Regiment (1994)
Fighter Wing: A Guided Tour of an Air Force Combat Wing (1995)
Marine: A Guided Tour of a Marine Expeditionary Unit (1996)
Airborne: A Guided Tour of an Airborne Task Force (1997)
Carrier: A Guided Tour of an Aircraft Carrier (1999)
Special Forces: A Guided Tour of U.S. Army Special Forces (2001)

Study in Command

Into the Storm – On the Ground in Iraq (with Fred Franks) (1997)
Every Man a Tiger — the Gulf War Air Campaign (with Chuck Horner) (1999)
Shadow Warriors — Inside the Special Forces (with Carl Stiner) (2002)
Battle Ready (with Anthony Zinni) (2004)

Other
The Tom Clancy Companion (1992, edited by Martin H. Greenberg)  — Writings by Clancy along with a concordance of all his fiction novels, detailing characters and military units or equipment.

Works by series

Jack Ryan series
 The Hunt for Red October (1984)
 Patriot Games (1987)
 The Cardinal of the Kremlin (1988)
 Debt of Honor (1994)
 Executive Orders (1996)
 The Bear and the Dragon (2000)
 Red Rabbit (2002)

The Campus series
 The Teeth of the Tiger (2003)
 Dead or Alive (2010, with Grant Blackwood)
 Locked On (2011, with Mark Greaney)
 Threat Vector (2012, with Mark Greaney)
 Command Authority (2013, with Mark Greaney)

John Clark series
 Without Remorse (1993)
 Rainbow Six (1998)

Standalone
 Red Storm Rising (1986, with Larry Bond) 
 SSN (1996, with  Martin Greenberg)
 Against All Enemies (2011, with Peter Telep)

Created by Tom Clancy
Note: The following novels are created by Clancy; they are not necessarily written by him.

Op-Center universe 

Created by Tom Clancy and Steve Pieczenik, written by Jeff Rovin unless otherwise indicated
 Op-Center (1995)
 Mirror Image (1995)
 Games of State (1996)
 Acts of War (1997)
 Balance of Power (1998)
 State of Siege (1999)
 Divide and Conquer (2000)
 Line of Control (2001)
 Mission of Honor (2002)
 Sea of Fire (2003)
 Call to Treason (2004)
 War of Eagles (2005)
 Out of the Ashes (2014, by Dick Couch and George Galdorisi)
 Into the Fire (2015, by Dick Couch and George Galdorisi)
 Scorched Earth (2016, by George Galdorisi)
 Dark Zone (2017, by Jeff Rovin and George Galdorisi)
 For Honor (2018, by Jeff Rovin)
 Sting of the Wasp (2019, by Jeff Rovin)
 God of War (2020, by Jeff Rovin)
 The Black Order (2021, by Jeff Rovin)
 Call of Duty (2022, by Jeff Rovin)
 Fallout (2023, by Jeff Rovin)

Net Force universe 

Created by Tom Clancy and Steve Pieczenik, written by Steve Perry unless otherwise indicated
 Net Force (1998)
 Hidden Agendas (1999)
 Night Moves (1999)
 Breaking Point (2000)
 Point of Impact (2001)
 CyberNation (2001)
 State of War (2003, by Steve Perry and Larry Segriff)
 Changing of the Guard (2003, by Steve Perry and Larry Segriff)
 Springboard (2005, by Steve Perry and Larry Segriff)
 The Archimedes Effect (2006, by Steve Perry and Larry Segriff)
 Code War (2013, novella by Jerome Preisler)

Net Force Relaunch 
Created by Tom Clancy and Steve Pieczenik, written by Jerome Preisler unless otherwise indicated
 Dark Web (2019)
 Eye of the Drone (2020, novella set before events of Dark Web)
 Attack Protocol (2020)
 Kill Chain (2021, novella set between events of Attack Protocol and Threat Point)
 Threat Point (2021)
 Moving Target (forthcoming 2023)

Net Force Explorers universe 

Created by Tom Clancy and Steve Pieczenik, written by Diane Duane unless otherwise indicated
 Virtual Vandals (1998)
 The Deadliest Game (1998)
 One is the Loneliest Number (1999)
 The Ultimate Escape (1999, by Marc Cerasini)
 The Great Race (1999, by Bill McCay)
 End Game (1999)
 Cyberspy (1999, by Bill McCay)
 Shadow of Honor (2000, by Mel Odom)
 Private Lives (2000, by Bill McCay)
 Safe House (2000)
 GamePrey (2000, by Mel Odom)
 Duel Identity (2000, by Bill McCay)
 Deathworld (2000)
 High Wire (2001, by John Helfers and Russel Davis)
 Cold Case (2001, by Bill McCay)
 Runaways (2001)
 Cloak and Dagger (2002)
 Death Match (2002)

Power Plays series 

Created by Tom Clancy and Martin Greenberg and written by Jerome Preisler
 Politika (1997)
 ruthless.com (1998)
 Shadow Watch (1999)
 Bio-Strike (2000)
 Cold War (2001)
 Cutting Edge (2002)
 Zero Hour (2003)
 Wild Card (2004)

Video game, novelizations and tie-ins
Note: Splinter Cell, EndWar, H.A.W.X, and Ghost Recon novelizations are mostly written by David Michaels, a pseudonym used by several authors, except where indicated.

Splinter Cell universe 
 Tom Clancy's Splinter Cell (2004)
 Tom Clancy's Splinter Cell: Operation Barracuda (2005)
 Tom Clancy's Splinter Cell: Checkmate (2006)
 Tom Clancy's Splinter Cell: Fallout (2007)
 Tom Clancy's Splinter Cell: Conviction (2009)
 Tom Clancy's Splinter Cell: Endgame (2009)
 Tom Clancy's Splinter Cell: Blacklist Aftermath (2013, by Peter Telep)
 Tom Clancy's Splinter Cell: Firewall (2022, by James Swallow)
 Tom Clancy's Splinter Cell: Dragonfire (forthcoming 2023, by James Swallow)

Comic books 
 Tom Clancy's Splinter Cell: Pandora Tomorrow (2006, written by Jerry Holkins and illustrated by Mike Krahulik)
 Tom Clancy's Splinter Cell: Digging in the Ashes (2010, written by Eddie Deighton & John Sloan and illustrated by Mike Dowling)
 Tom Clancy's Splinter Cell: Echoes (2014, written by Nathan Edmondson and illustrated by Marc Laming)

Ghost Recon universe 
 Tom Clancy's Ghost Recon (2008)
 Tom Clancy's Ghost Recon: Combat Ops (2011)
 Tom Clancy's Ghost Recon: Choke Point (2012, by Peter Telep)
 Tom Clancy's Ghost Recon Wildlands: Dark Waters (2017, by Richard Dansky)

EndWar universe 
 Tom Clancy's EndWar (2008)
 Tom Clancy's EndWar: The Hunted (2011)
 Tom Clancy's EndWar: The Missing (2013, by Peter Telep)

H.A.W.X universe 
 Tom Clancy's H.A.W.X (2009)

The Division universe 
 Tom Clancy's The Division: New York Collapse (2016, by Alex Irvine)
 Tom Clancy's The Division: Broken Dawn (2019, by Alex Irvine)
 Tom Clancy's The Division: Recruited (2022, by Thomas Parrott)
 Tom Clancy's The Division: Compromised (2023, by Thomas Parrott)

Comic books 
 Tom Clancy's The Division: Extremis Malis (2019, by Christofer Emgard)
 Tom Clancy's The Division: Remission (2021, by Jean-David Morvan)

References

Further reading
 Baiocco, Richard ed. Readings on Tom Clancy (2003), a guide to Clancy
 Gallagher, Mark. Action Figures: Men, Action Films, and Contemporary Adventure Narratives (Springer, 2006).
 Garson, Helen S. Tom Clancy: A Critical Companion (1996) online free to read
 Greenberg, Martin. H. The Tom Clancy Companion (1992) excerpt; also online free to read

External links
In Depth interview with Clancy, February 3, 2002, C-SPAN

 
Bibliographies by writer
Bibliographies of American writers
American spy fiction